Camooweal is an outback town and locality in the City of Mount Isa, Queensland, Australia. The locality is on the Queensland border with the Northern Territory.

Geography
The locality of Camooweal is in north-western in the Gulf Region bounded by the west by the Northern Territory. The town of Camooweal is located in the south-west corner of the locality.

The Barkly Highway enters the locality from the south (Barkly), passes from east to west through the town centre (where it is known as Barkly Street) and then exits to the west (Northern Territory).

The Georgina River enters the locality from the west (Northern Territory), passes to the immediate west of the town and then exits to south of the locality (Barkly). Lake Francis and Lake Canellan are both on the Georgina River and lie to the south-east of the town.

The locality is a drainage divide running from the north-west to the south-east of the locality. The watercourses in the north and east of the locality are tributaries of the Nicholson River which flows into the Gulf of Carpentaria to the north. Gulf drainage Whereas the watercourses in the south and west of the locality are tributaries of the Georgina River which is part of the Lake Eyre drainage basin.

Camooweal has the following mountains:

 Dog Tooth 
 Quality Knobs 

The Camooweal Caves National Park is a  protected area in the south-west of the locality to the south-east of the town. Crater of Caves is an area within the park. Cavern is another area with caves but outside of the national park.

Apart from the national park, the predominant land use in the locality is grazing on native vegetation.

History
The area was originally inhabited by the Indjilandji Indigenous Australians.

William Landsborough in 1861 named the Barkly Tablelands after the Governor of Victoria, His Excellency, Sir Henry Barkly. He also named Lake Francis after his niece Frances Landsborough. The first Britisher to attempt to colonise the area was George Sutherland, who took up the Rocklands lease in 1865. Sutherland arrived at Lake Mary on the Georgina River with 8,000 sheep, which caused the Aboriginal people, who were sleeping at time, to run. Sutherland was attacked by them on several occasions in the following months. When fellow colonists William Lyne and Henry Steiglitz arrived on the river, Sutherland "deemed it fully time to make a raid and drive them [the Aboriginal people] back." One of the group fired a shot, hitting a group of boomerangs which scared the Aboriginal people into fleeing. Stock losses to the local dingos and wedge-tailed eagles; lack of water and isolation soon forced him to abandon his lease. The Englishmen Benjamin Crosthwaite and William Tetley, who were marginally more successful, took up the lease again in 1876.

The origin of the town's name is uncertain. One theory is that it take its name from surveyor George Telford Weale, who surveyed the area using camels in the early 1880s. Another theory is that it is an Aboriginal word meaning strong wind.

The initial town was gazetted in 1884 to be built on a  plot by Lake Francis. A year later the present site was re-gazetted. The Rocklands Post Office was removed and Camooweal Post Office opened on 27 April 1885. A police station opened in 1886.

Camooweal Provisional School opened on 5 June 1893. On 1 Jan 1909 it became Camooweal State School.

The town bore was drilled in 1897.

On 2 January 1931, a Qantas Air Ambulance from the Royal Flying Doctor Service of Australia flown by E.G. Donaldson rescued a man in Camooweal and delivered him to Brisbane.

The road through Camooweal to the Northern Territory (now the Barkly Highway) was the inland defence route for World War II. This road was built by army engineers and carried over 1000 vehicles a day and there are numerous historical sites marked along the road.

The town had electricity from 1952.

St Therese's Catholic Church was officially opened on 30 April 1961 by Hugh Edward Ryan, Bishop of Townsville.

The Camooweal Caves National Park was gazetted on 16 December 1994.

Given the economic importance of transport on the Barkly Highway (the only sealed road between Queensland and the Northern Territory), a longstanding problem was the flooding of the Georgina River at Camooweal. During floods, the Barkly Highway bridge over the Georgina River was often unusable for many days, with road trains and other heavy vehicles having to wait weeks before it was safe to cross. To alleviate these problems, the new Georgina River Bridge was officially opened on 20 December 2002 by Senator Ron Boswell and Steve Breadhauer, Minister for Transport in the Queensland Government. The bridge uses an unusual arch design to avoid placing pylons into the river bed which is culturally significant to the local Dugalunji people, who call the new bridge Ilaga Thuwani meaning The Camping Ground of the Rainbow Serpent.

In 2005 the Mount Isa City Council erected a war memorial outside the community hall (former shire hall of the Shire of Barkly Tableland).

Heritage listings
Camooweal has a number of heritage-listed sites, including:
 32 Barkly Street: Community Hall
44 Barkly Street: Freckleton's Stores
 Barkly Highway: Tree of Knowledge
 Rocklands Station: Hodgkinson's Marked Tree

Education 

Camooweal State School is a government primary (Early Childhood-6) school for boys and girls at Nowranie Street. In 2018, the school had an enrolment of 31 students with 3 teachers and 5 non-teaching staff (3 full-time equivalent).

There are no secondary schools within reach of the locality (the nearest is Spinifex State College in Mount Isa). The options are distance education and boarding school. Spinifex State College has boarding facilities.

Economy 
There are a number of homesteads in the locality, including:

 Don
 Morstone
 No 3 Outstation
 Old Morstone
 Rocklands
 Split Rock
 Thorntonia
 Undilla

Transport 

Camooweal Airport serves the town and is just to the north-east of the town.

There are numerous airstrips in the locality including:

 Camooweal Caves NP airstrip
Herbert Vale airstrip (also known as No 3 Outstation)
Morstone airstrip
Rocklands airstrip #1
Rocklands airstrip #2
 Rocklands airstrip #3
Rocklands airstrip #4 near Chester Creek bore
Rocklands airstrip #5 near Coolibah Dam
Rocklands airstrip #6 (also known as Darien Gate)
Thorntonia airstrip
Undilla airstrip (also known as Promised Land)

Facilities 

Camooweal Police Station is at 40 Nowranie Street.

Camooweal Volunteer Rural Fire Service and SES Facility is at 21 Barkly Street.

Camooweal Primary Health Care Clinic and ambulance station is at 52-60 Morrison Street.

Camooweal Cemetery is at the end of Cemetery Road, east of the airport. It is operated by the Mount Isa City Council.

Amenities

St Theresa's Catholic Church is at 31 Nowranie Street. It is part of the Good Shepherd Catholic Parish in Mount Isa.

Camooweal Post Office is at 29 Barkly Street.

The Post Office Hotel Motel and Caravan Park at 39 Barkly Street provides accommodation, food and drink.

There are a number of parks in the area:

 Sportsground (cricket & tennis), 19 Barkly Street
 Ellen Finlay Memorial Park, 26-30 Nowranie Street
 Cronin Park (racecourse and showgrounds), Camooweal Urandangi Road

Along the main road (the Barkly Highway) there are several caravan stops or van parks which will take mobile homes and tents.

Attractions 

The Drover's Camp is a museum celebrating the contribution of drovers.

Events 
The Drover's Camp Festival is held annually in August. It was not held in 2020 due to the COVID-19 pandemic.

There are regular rodeos, campdrafts, gymkhanas, and horse racing events held most years.

In popular culture 
Australian country musician Slim Dusty recorded a song written by David Kirkpatrick and Alex "Mack" Cormack entitled simply Camooweal which features this town.

Climate

References

Further reading

External links

 

 
North West Queensland
Towns in Queensland
Queensland in World War II
City of Mount Isa
Localities in Queensland